Hague Agreement  may refer to:
 The Dutch-Indonesian Round Table Conference
 The Hague Agreement Concerning the International Deposit of Industrial Designs